Battle Chef Brigade is a brawler and puzzle video game developed by Trinket Studios and published by Adult Swim Games. The game was released for Windows and Nintendo Switch in November 2017.

Gameplay
Battle Chef Brigade is a video game that combines gameplay from tile-matching puzzle video games and side-scrolling brawler games.

You start cooking by dropping ingredients into your cookware like Tetris. With the ingredients in the 4x4 cooking zone you can stir them around like in Puyo Puyo. When Mina aligns flavor gems and match the same colors the gems combine to increase their rank and the quality of the dish. The more you match and rank up the gems the higher quality the dish is. After you've finished cooking, and before the time limit is up, you have to deliver the dish to the judge.

Development and release
Battle Chef Brigade was developed by Trinket Studios. In 2014, the developers crowdfunded over  through a Kickstarter campaign. The studio was founded by former employees of Wideload Games.

Battle Chef Brigade was published by Adult Swim Games and released for Windows and Nintendo Switch on 20 November 2017.

Reception

Battle Chef Brigade received "generally favorable" reviews from professional critics according to review aggregator website Metacritic. GamesRadar+ ranked it 24th on their list of the 25 Best Games of 2017.

The game was nominated for "Game, Puzzle" and "Performance in a Comedy, Lead" with Erica Mendez as the character Mina at the National Academy of Video Game Trade Reviewers Awards.

References

External links
 

2017 video games
Crowdfunded video games
Kickstarter-funded video games
Video games developed in the United States
Windows games
Nintendo Switch games
PlayStation 4 games
Adult Swim games
Cooking video games